Novotny & Maroudi – Zahngötter in Weiß is an Austrian television series about two middle-aged dentists.

See also
List of Austrian television series

Austrian television series
2005 Austrian television series debuts
2007 Austrian television series endings
2000s Austrian television series
ORF (broadcaster)
German-language television shows